In professional wrestling, a gimmick generally refers to a wrestler's in-ring persona, character, behaviour, attire and/or other distinguishing traits while performing which are usually artificially created in order to draw fan interest.

These in-ring personalities often involve costumes, makeup and catchphrases that they shout at their opponents or the fans.

Gimmicks can be designed to work as good guys/heroes (babyfaces) or bad guys/villains (heels)  depending on the wrestler's desire to be popular or hated by the crowd. A tweener gimmick falls between the two extremes, such as wrestlers who manifests many heel and face traits such as Randy Orton's viper gimmick. A wrestler may portray more than one gimmick over their career depending on the angle or the wrestling promotion that they are working for at that time.

Promotions will use gimmicks on more than one person, albeit at different times, occasionally taking advantage of a masked character which allows for the identity of the wrestler in question to be concealed. Razor Ramon was portrayed by both Scott Hall and Rick Bognar and Kane was portrayed by Aran Parmar and then Glen Jacobs.

Occasionally, a wrestler uses a gimmick as a tribute to another worker; such is the case of Ric Flair's Nature Boy persona which he took on as an homage to the original Nature Boy, Buddy Rogers.

When a wrestler acts outside his or her gimmick this is known as 'breaking kayfabe', a term showing pro wrestling's linkages to theatre, where the more common term "breaking the fourth wall" is used.

Gimmicks are annually rated for the Wrestling Observer Newsletter awards by the publication's owner, professional wrestling journalists, and various industry insiders, such as Dave Meltzer, promoters, agents and performers, other journalists, historians, and fans. The two awards are given to the best and worst gimmick of that year.

History

Beginnings (1860s to 1940s) 

Pro wrestling's history has been tied to the use of gimmicks from its infancy. From its circus origins in the 1830s, showmen presented wrestlers under names such as “Edward, the steel eater”, “Gustave d’Avignon, the bone wrecker”, or “Bonnet, the ox of the low Alps” and challenged the public to knock them down for 500 francs.

During the late 19th century-early 20th century, when wrestler Frank Gotch rose to prominence, the focus became on contests largely legitimate (see catch wrestling), which largely resulted in the abandoning previous character gimmicks.

Television era (1950s to 1970s) 

It was not until the First Golden Age of Professional Wrestling in the United States during the 1940s–1950s, when Gorgeous George created pro wrestling's first major gimmick. His heel character focused on his looks and quickly antagonized the fans with his exaggerated effeminate behavior, drawing jealousy to the fans. Such showmanship was unheard of for the time; and consequently, arena crowds grew in size as fans turned out to ridicule George.

Gorgeous George's impact and legacy on wrestling gimmicks was enormous, demonstrating how fast television changed the product from athletics to performance. Before him, wrestlers gimmicks imitated "ethnic terrors" (Nazis, Middle Eastern Muslims (Arabs, Turks, Persians, Afghans, etc.), Japanese, Russians, etc.), but his success birthed a more individualistic and narcissist form of character.

He was one of the first pro-wrestlers to use entrance music, "Pomp and Circumstance" which always played as he made his way to the ring.

In Britain, television took British wrestling to the next level when in 1964, it went full-time as part of the World of Sport show.

The style of wrestling at the time was unique with strong emphasis on clean technical wrestling. Heels made up a minority of the roster, with most shows containing an abnormally high proportion of clean sportsmanly matches between two "blue-eyes" (as faces were known backstage in the UK). This would remain the case for several decades to come. Gimmick matches were a rarity, midget wrestling failed to catch on, while women were banned by the Greater London Council until the late 1970s.

Explosion (1980–present) 

During the Golden Age of pro wrestling in the 1980s–1990s, a rise of cartoonish, outlandish gimmicks became popular with the increase of the World Wrestling Federation's popularity.

The WWF contributed to the explosion of gimmicks by becoming the most colorful and well-known wrestling brand because of its child-oriented characters, soap opera dramatics and cartoon-like personas. Most notable was the muscular Hulk Hogan, who marked the 1980s with his "Real-American" gimmick and made his main events into excellent ratings draws. His dominant role in the industry at that time led to this era to be also known as "Hulkamania". Around this time,  wrestling became a form of entertainment rather than an official sport.

Other wrestlers from this era with similarly vivid and outlandish characterization include The Ultimate Warrior, Randy Savage, The Undertaker, Sting, Goldust, Roddy Piper, Ric Flair, "The Heartbreak Kid" Shawn Michaels, Big Daddy Cool Diesel, Kwang, The Bushwhackers, Big Boss Man, Tatanka, Razor Ramon, Sgt. Slaughter, Irwin R. Schyster, among many others.

Following the Attitude era, the emphasis of gimmicks has been more realistic with wrestlers portraying themselves or actual people without the exaggeration, freakishness or fantastical qualities. It's also more common for the wrestlers to use their actual names. Wrestlers like Randy Orton, Batista, Bobby Lashley, John Cena, and Brock Lesnar are prime examples. All the said wrestlers are depicted as less-exaggerated average people.

Although rare, colorful and cartoon-like characters remain in the WWE, such as Shinsuke Nakamura (a wildly random, erratic mixed martial arts enigma, emotionally charged by the sound of violins) and Matt Riddle (a stereotypical carefree, barefoot surfer Valley boy). Outside WWE, some wrestlers have made names for themselves on the crowded independent circuit by adopting absurdist comedy gimmicks intended to be understood by post-kayfabe fans as purely fictional characters. Two such wrestlers whose independent-scene popularity got them noticed and eventually signed by the internationally televised promotion All Elite Wrestling are Orange Cassidy, an emotionless slacker who puts as little effort as possible into his matches and frequently wrestles with his hands in his pockets; and Danhausen, a demonic but somewhat-bumbling figure in horror face paint who claims to be "very nice, very evil" and attempts to put curses on his opponents.

Common gimmicks

Related to origin
Exaggerating the characteristics of a wrestler's (on occasion fabricated) origin is one of the most commonly exploited gimmicks, in which overarching characteristics of a character play up to clichés and stereotypes.

A long list of wrestlers in this category includes:  Albanian (Rezar), Arab (The Sheik, The Sultan, Muhammad Hassan), African (Kamala, Abdullah The Butcher, Akeem, Apollo Crews), American (The Patriot, Hulk Hogan, 'Hacksaw' Jim Duggan, Jack Swagger), Australian (The Bushwackers, Outback Jack, Nathan Jones, Buddy Murphy), Austrian (Walter), Brazilian (Arturo Ruas, Taynara Conti), Bulgarian (Rusev), Canadian  (Team Canada (TNA), Team Canada (WCW)), Chinese (Xia Li, Boa), Cowboy  (Bob Orton Jr.), Cuban (Razor Ramon), Dominican (No Way Jose), Dutch (Aleister Black), English (William Regal, Lord Alfred Hayes, Gentleman Jack Gallagher), Fijian (Jimmy Snuka), French (La Résistance), German (Alexander Wolfe, Marcel Barthel), Guyanese (Ezekiel Jackson), Hawaiian (Crush, Leilani Kai, Ricky Steamboat), Indian (The Great Khali, Jinder Mahal, Akam), Iranian (The Iron Sheik, Ariya Daivari), Irish (Finlay, Sheamus), Israeli (Noam Dar), Italian (FBI, Santino Marella, Fabian Aichner), Jamaican (Kofi Kingston), Japanese (The Orient Express, Mr. Fuji, Kai En Tai), Korean (Gail Kim), Lithuanian (Aksana), Mexican (Alberto Del Rio, Eddie Guerrero, The Mexicools), Moldovan (Alex Koslov, Marina Shafir) Native American/American Indian (Chief Jay Strongbow, Tatanka), New Zealander/Maori (The Sheepherders, Dakota Kai), Puerto Rican (Carlito Colón, Primo and Epico), Polish (Dabba-Kato/Commander Azeez,), Russian (Vladimir Kozlov, Nikolai Volkoff, Lana), Samoan (Samoa Joe, The Wild Samoans, Roman Reigns, The Usos) Scottish (Drew McIntyre, Roddy Piper), South African (Adam Rose, Justin Gabriel) Swiss (Cesaro), Thai (Super Invader), Tongan (Haku, Tama Tonga, Tanga Loa), and Welsh (Mason Ryan).

The undeniable influence of the Puroresu style in the world of professional wrestling has resulted in many wrestlers using fabricated Japanese origins or being billed from a Japanese city, without actually being natives of the country. Prime examples of this include Yokozuna, Awesome Kong, Hawaiians Professor Tanaka and Mr. Fuji, and British wrestler Kendo Nagasaki. Several Japanese wrestlers who wrestle outside of their home country are known to play up or exaggerate aspects of their cultural heritage as part of their gimmicks for an overseas audience.

Masked

Masked wrestlers made their appearance in Europe (Theobaud Bauer in France, 1865) and the United States (Mort Henderson as "Masked Marvel" in 1915) considerably earlier than in Mexico, but it was the latter that popularised the use of masks. This, in some cases to signify a high-flyer style, influenced by Lucha Libre.

A specific masked gimmick may be used by more than one wrestler at a wrestling company's request since their identity can be permanently concealed. This is the case of Mexican Sin Cara and Japanese Tiger Mask. Masks also allow a wrestler to perform as more than one character for a variety of wrestling promotions. In Mexico, a masked wrestler's identity is often not even a matter of public record, and being unmasked, usually as a stipulation of losing a match, is considered a great humiliation. It is a major taboo for a Mexican wrestler who has lost his mask to start wearing one again, though this has occasionally been violated, as in the case of Rey Mysterio.

Other wrestlers who have used masks in their performances include: The Masked Superstar, Mexican-American Kalisto, Lince Dorado, Gran Metalik, or Japanese legend Jushin Thunder Liger.

Sports
A high number of wrestlers who start their careers in another sport incorporate their athletic abilities as part of their act. That is the case for Olympic medallist Kurt Angle, who previously competed in freestyle wrestling and alludes to it in his attire and wrestling style. Brock Lesnar is also an ex-amateur wrestler, NFL player and UFC champion. Welsh wrestler Mason Ryan is also a former Gladiator and football player. English wrestler Wade Barrett was also a former bare-knuckle fighter as well as Elijah Burke who is also a former amateur boxer. Former MMA fighters Ronda Rousey and Shayna Baszler also uses their MMA background as part of their characters as well as former American Ninja Warrior competitor Kacy Catanzaro, former kung-fu fighter Xia Li, and Matt Riddle, who always wrestles barefooted during matches, presuming that he had an MMA background career in the past before debuting in WWE along with Mojo Rawley's "hyperactive" wrestling style due to being a former NFL player before debuting WWE as well as the stable The Four Horsemen.

Superheroes, supervillains and other comic-based characters

The theatrical nature of professional wrestling easily blends with comic hero and villain characters, made popular in the 1980s by legend The Ultimate Warrior and Sting, whose character was inspired by the 1994 movie The Crow, based on the comic book of the same name.

Other wrestlers with superhero and supervillain gimmicks include late WWE Hall of Famer Dusty Rhodes' sons Gold and Stardust, Big Van Vader, Bam Bam Bigelow, Pierre Carl Ouellet, Dr. Luther, the magician Phantasio, Icarus, Super Eric, Dexter Lumis, Samoan Rosey during his "the Super Hero in Training" (the S.H.I.T.) phase and his tag-team partner The Hurricane and valet Super Stacy, Earthquake/Avalanche and his tag-team partner Typhoon in The Natural Disasters stable, and tag-teams The Road Warriors, Demolition, KroniK, The Assassins, The Super Assassins, The Machines, and most recently, The Ascension, and The Viking Raiders/War Machine.

Some of these characters are brought during very short periods of time for entertainment value. The Joker and Harley Quinn from the Batman comics have inspired wrestling attire for Sting and Alexa Bliss respectively. Finn Bálor's Demon King persona is visually based on Spider-Man villains Venom and Carnage. Sandman's character name is also based on Spider-Man villain Sandman as well as Rhyno, who's character name was based on a pun on the Spider-Man villain Rhino. Raven's character name was based on DC Comics superhero, Raven. Kenny Omega's taunts were inspired by video games since he was a big fan of them. Mantaur's character name was also based on a pun on the word Minotaur, a half-man, half-bull creature from Greek Mythology. Luchasaurus' character name is a portmanteau of "lucha libre" and "dinosaurus". Tag-team The Super Smash Brothers's name was based on the video game franchise Super Smash Bros. Nikki Cross also changed her gimmick and name like that of a superhero, into Nikki A.S.H. (Almost a Superhero). TNA's Dean Roll's ring name, Shark Boy, became the inspiration for the 3D film, The Adventures of Sharkboy and Lavagirl in 3-D.

Supernatural-based characters
 
Similarly to superheroes and supervillains, supernatural characters add to entertainment value. Most famously in this category is The Undertaker, considered one of the most respected wrestlers in the business, whose gimmick is a horror-themed character of an undead, macabre and paranormal dark presence prone to scare tactics. He was managed by the ghostly character that was Paul Bearer and tagged with his half-brother Kane in The Brothers of Destruction stable.

Other wrestlers displaying supposed supernatural powers include Matt Hardy (as his Broken/Woken persona), and his younger brother Jeff Hardy (as his Brother Nero/Willow character), Mordecai, Waylon Mercy, Jake "The Snake" Roberts, Papa Shango, The Boogeyman, Abyss, and most recently Asuka, Aleister Black, and Bray Wyatt's The Fiend, and stables The Three Faces of Fear, and The Dungeon of Doom. Japanese Onryo portrays a dead wrestler who returned for vengeance.

Raven was the leader of five stables; Raven's Nest, The Flock, The Dead Pool, The Gathering, and Serotonin.

The Brood was a vampire stable, composed of Gangrel, Christian and Edge.

Alexa Bliss was also given a different gimmick after her alliance with Bray Wyatt in late 2020s, appearing suddenly and sometimes attacking the other wrestlers, the same things that Bray Wyatt would do.

Juggernaut
Since its beginnings in the circus circuit, the professional wrestler's stereotype has been that of large, powerful and strong, most notably Kane upon his arrival to the WWF/E. Various wrestlers have banked on the larger size which has influenced their in-ring style and persona.

Notable examples of these kind include Swede Tor Johnson (181 kg), Gorilla Monsoon (182 kg), Giant González (8 ft 0 in), André the Giant (7 ft 4 in), The Great Khali (7 ft 3 in), Big Show (7 ft 2 in), Awesome Kong and Nia Jax (123 kg).

Midget

Similarly to juggernauts, since its beginnings in the circus circuit, the professional wrestler's stereotype has been that of small, but powerful and strong like those of dwarves of Norse mythology. Various wrestlers have banked on the small size which has influenced their in-ring style and persona.

Notable examples of these kind include the leprechaun Hornswoggle, El Torito and other various dwarfed versions of other various wrestlers.

Educational
Education is a rare gimmick in wrestling due to the fact that, most times, the wrestler is a former real-life student or scholar of a school, a college, a university, or a TAFE, who also worked as a cheerleader, a coach, a dean, a librarian, a teacher, or even a principal. Wrestlers who used this gimmick include NXT wrestlers, e.g. Alex Riley etc., Bobby "The Brain" Heenan, Sgt. Slaughter, Dean Douglas, Jonathan Coachman, Michelle McCool's "sexy teacher" character, The Miz's and Jack Swagger's "student" amateur background characters, Damien Sandow's "Intellectual Savior of the Unwashed Masses" character, and "The Librarian" Peter Avalon and his manager Leva Bates, and tag-teams The Steiner Brothers, The Spirit Squad, and most recently, Team Rhodes Scholars, American Alpha, and Chase University.

Bad News reporter
Bad News reporter characters are a villainous gimmick; due to any "bad news" reported to the fans by a "bad guy" (heel); but is quite rare since that fans are not quite interested in it either. Wrestlers who used this gimmick include Bad News Brown, and most recently, "Bad News" Barrett.

Religious
Religion is often a rare gimmick in Professional Wrestling due to its controversial nature. Wrestlers who used this gimmick include Friar Ferguson, and most recently, "Bolieve" Bo Dallas, and "The Monday Night Messiah" Seth Rollins.

Hardcore technician

Whilst being way beyond over the limit from some sheer violence is scary in some matches, hardcore technician gimmicks are also another popular choice for gimmicks, due to the fans being over with getting used to watching sheer violence as they don't shy away from it either. These include Abdullah the Butcher, and Bruiser Brody, which came popular into other professional wrestling companies like ECW wrestlers, e.g. Terry Funk, Hardcore Holly, New Jack, and Mick Foley/Mankind/Cactus Jack, etc., CZW wrestlers, e.g. John Zandig, Necro Butcher, Wifebeater, Nick Mondo, and Nick Gage, etc., AEW wrestlers, e.g. The Blade, and The Butcher, etc., Japanese Wrestlers Atsushi Onita, Toshiaki Kawada, and Jun Kasai, and tag-teams The Motor City Machine Guns, and most recently, The Mechanics, and Heavy Machinery.

Music-based characters
Music influences are another popular choice for gimmicks. In the 80's, The Honky Tonk Man worked with a Elvisesque character. Elias also works well with his musician guitar character. Rapping was demonstrated by R-Truth/K-Kwik's original rapper character along with Road Dogg and John Cena worked during the first years of his career with a rapper gimmick. Other music genre types were demonstrated by CM Punk's straight edge iconoclast hardcore punk, party boys No Way Jose and Adam Rose, Cameron Grimes, Rick Boogs, Rockstar Spud, Heath Slater, Lance Archer, Chris Jericho, Jeff Jarrett, Marty Jannetty, The Honky Tonk Man, Disco Inferno, One Man Gang, Buck Zumhofe, WWE's Brodus Clay and his fun-loving, funk dancing gimmick "The Funkasaurus" and Fandango who includes salsa dancing in his routine, and AEW's Jack Evans who usually does breakdancing in the ring during entrances or when he's won a match, and tag-teams The Public Enemy, Badd Company, The Rockers, The Rock 'n' Roll Express, The Rhythm and Blues, and most recently, The Vaudevillains. AEW's Adam Williams is also a professional wrestler and a real-life guitarist.

Comedy

Whilst humor has long been present in professional wrestling matches and many wrestlers incorporate elements of comedy in their act, full-on comedic gimmicks are not commonly seen. These are sometimes reserved for wrestlers who not always have the stereotypical physique required in the industry and instead exploit their entertainment abilities.

Initiated by English wrestler Les Kellett, wrestlers who fall under this category are Doink The Clown which was majorly portrayed by Matt Osborne until his death in 2013, which inspired others like Scottish comedian and actor Grado, Ring of Honor's Colt Cabana, Santino Marella, James Ellsworth, and Eugene's "mentally disabled boy" character, Japanese Wrestlers Stalker Ichikawa, Gran Naniwa, Kuishinbo Kamen and Toru Yano, Charlie Haas during his impersonations run, and WWE's 1990s turkey character Gobbledy Gooker, and rooster character Red Rooster, WCW's Brian Pillman, and Al Snow along with his mannequin prop called "Head" which he used as a sidekick companion during segments while addressing the fans. And recently, The New Day pursued a joyous gimmick, giving them a character heavily associated with the fans. Damien Sandow also falls under this category due to his 'stunt double' gimmick in late 2014 where he copied whatever his on-screen mentor The Miz did, due to the latter using a gimmick of an arrogant movie star. R-Truth also influenced his character with some of his comedic activities, such as breaking out a joke, dancing and finding out his opponent to win the 24/7 Championship in a strange and funny way.

Charity
Characters who do charity are depicted as a heroic gimmick due to real-life charity. Wrestlers who used this gimmick include Sweet Daddy Siki, Brother Love, "Make a Difference" Fatu, Dude Love, and most recently, "The Doctor of Hug-o-nomics" Bayley, and tag-team Men on a Mission.

Self-absorbed
Usually a villainous gimmick, initiated by Gorgeous George, due to the jealousy of the good looks the fans want to have for themselves. Wrestlers that followed on with this trend include Sonny Kiss, Angel Garza, "The Untouchable" Carmella, Lana with her catchphrase, "I am the best in the world", "Dashing" Cody Rhodes, "The Black Machismo" Jay Lethal, "The Artist Collective" Sami Zayn, "The Masterpiece" Chris Masters, Byron Saxton, "The Swiss Superman" Antonio Cesaro, Dolph Ziggler with his "perfection" gimmick, The Miz with his catchphrase, "AWESOME", Randy Orton, "The Glamazon" Beth Phoenix, Carlito Caribbean Cool, "The Phenominal" AJ Styles, "Glorious" Bobby Roode, "The Almighty" Bobby Lashley, "The Golden Standard" Shelton Benjamin, Scotty 2 Hotty, "The Rated R Superstar" Edge, The "Great One" Rock, "The World's Strongest Man" Mark Henry, Val Venis, "The Heartbreak Kid" Shawn Michaels, "Big Sexy" Kevin Nash, Lex Luger's "The Narcissist" character, "Beautiful" Bobby Eaton, Ravishing Rick Rude, "The Model" Rick Martel, "Adorable" Adrian Adonis, Hulk Hogan, "Macho Man" Randy Savage, Jesse "The Body" Ventura, "The Nature Boy" Ric Flair and his daughter, "Handsome" Harley Race, "Classy" Freddie Blassie, AEW's "Pretty" Peter Avalon, and Powerhouse Hobbs, TNA's Mr Pec-tacular, Brian Christopher's Grand Master Sexay, Billy Gunn's Mr Ass, Curt Hennig's Mr Perfect, Paul Orndorff's Mr Wonderful, NXT's Tyler Breeze, Lacey Evans, and "The Finest" Kona Reeves, and tag-teams The Mexicools, and Too Cool, as well as women's tag-teams The Beautiful People, LayCool, Fire and Desire, and The IIconics.

Hollywood movie star
Hollywood movie stars are occasionally villainous due to fame outside of wrestling as a real-life Hollywood actor/actress. These include "Hollywood" Hulk Hogan, The Rock, and most recently, Batista, John Cena, The Miz, and David Otunga's A-list character, and tag-teams The Hollywood Blondes, and MNM, and most recently, The Bollywood Boyz, despite being of Indian descent and being billed from the famous Indian filming district of Bollywood, Mumbai (Bombay), instead which they were named after (although the name "Bollywood" was borrowed from the word "Hollywood" but with a "B" instead of a "H" to describe a famous filming district in Mumbai (Bombay), in India, which it was named after).

Authority figure-based characters

Authority figures are apparently villainous but sometimes as heroic characters as wrestlers and non-wrestlers (e.g. referees, general managers, security, police, etc.) as well depending on the storyline. Some wrestlers also use a character based on an authority over other people. These include non-wrestlers like managers, and wrestlers like The Mountie, Big Boss Man, "The Alpha Male" Marcus Cor Von, Consequences Creed, "The Man" Becky Lynch, "The Boss" Sasha Banks, Sean O'Haire's devil advocate gimmick, and David Otunga's legal adviser character, ECW's 911, and stables New World Order, Right to Censor, The Truth Commission, The Acolytes Protection Agency, 3-Minute Warning, and most recently, The Authors of Pain, The Shield, and The Authority.

Money-based characters (Evil billionaire/Millionaire tyrant)
The evil billionaire/millionaire tyrant character works well as a villain — due to the jealousy of the fans who want the things "money can't buy" for themselves which they can't afford — in contrast to professional wrestling's working-class fan-base. It is because of this audience that Dusty Rhodes' Common Man or "American Dream" was highly successful with the crowds.

The original gimmick of this type was created by "Million Dollar Man" Ted DiBiase, which consequently inspired wrestlers like his son, which includes being owners of the promotion, like Mr. McMahon and his family (including his son and daughter (since they are the real owners of WWE)), and most recently, "The Dream" Velveteen Dream, and stables The Diamond Exchange, The Beverly Brothers, The Million Dollar Corporation, Money Inc., Beer Money, Inc., and most recently, The Prime Time Players, The Street Profits, and The Hurt Business. JBL used his real-life work as Wall Street investor as base for his JBL character.

Ruthless ruler
Similarly to evil billionaire/millionaire tyrant characters, and even authority figures, ruthless ruler characters are mostly a villainous gimmick based on real-life royals, imperials, empires, monarchs, or around other non-royal characters, like bureaucrats, aristocrats, diplomats, nobles, and gents. Wrestlers who originally used this gimmick include Lord Alfred Hayes, which inspired others like Baron von Raschke, "King" James Valiant, The Duke of Dorchester, Jerry "The King" Lawler, The Sultan, King Booker, Hunter Hearst Helmsley, Prince Nana, Tiger Ali Singh's rich and arrogant Asiatic heir character and his manservant Babu, William Regal's arrogant royal noble English ambassador character and his manager Sir William, and most recently, Dalton Castle, Gentleman Jack Gallagher, Baron Corbin who uses the gimmick of a villainous and an evil king, after winning the 2019 king of the ring tournament, but lost to Shinsuke Nakamura who is using the gimmick like that of the Japanese emperor after winning the "Battle For The Crown" against Corbin, Roman Reigns who is using the gimmick of the head of the table and the tribal chief, representing his tribe, upon his heel turn, Jinder Mahal as the Modern Maharaja, associating with his Indian ancestry, Apollo Crews as a proud representative of Nigeria, and Alberto Del Rio's arrogant rich Mexican aristocrat character and his personal ring announcer, Ricardo Rodriguez, and stables The Nation of Domination, The Kings of Wrestling, The British Invasion, The British Bulldogs, The Blue Bloods, Los Conquistadores, and most recently, The Kingdom, The Undisputed Era, and The Imperium.

Hated crime gang/Terrorist thugs/Bad guy bandits/Mafia mobsters
Hated crime gang/terrorist thugs/bad guy bandits/mafia mobsters work perfectly well as villainous gimmick due to real-life crime gangs, terrorist thugs, bandits, and mobsters but has become a more popular gimmick (partially due to being over with fans who seem to be more malicious, malevolent, violent, aggressive, erratic, or hostile, and seem show no respect, remorse or sympathy — especially when they show some profanity — to the heels, even if they are trying to be friendly, polite, or nice to them, especially when they are telling them they are or telling them to by placating them). These include Razor Ramon, The Brooklyn Brawler, Stone Cold Steve Austin, Eddie Guerrero and Chavo Guerrero with their catchphrase, "I lie, I cheat, I steal"/"We lie, We cheat, We steal", "Brutal" Bob Evans, Beer City Bruiser, Shannon Moore, John Cena's "thug nature" character, and most recently, Eddie Edwards, Sami Callihan, Darby Allin, and Bandido, and tag-teams Cryme Tyme, D-Generation X, The New Age Outlaws, The Disciples of Apocalypse, The Gangstas/The Gangstanators, FBI, LAX, Mexican America, La Familia, The Forever Hooligans, and most recently, Riott Squad, The Forgotten Sons, Social Outcasts, Enzo Amore and Big Cass, Sanity, Aces & Eights, The Bullet Club, and Retribution.

Other usage 

Within professional wrestling in insider usage the word 'gimmick' has come to refer to an array of other related terms, including any weapon or foreign object used during a match or the scripted quality of a match.
In backstage lingo, gimmick is also a stand-in for basically any physical noun or set of moves in a match.
Gimmicked is used to describe an object that is altered or rigged for use in a match. For example, a gimmicked table or chair which would be precut or made to fall apart more easily.
An event that is referred to as a gimmick event is one that is centred around a match type, such as the pay-per-view events WWE Hell in a Cell and WWE TLC: Tables, Ladders, & Chairs.
The term is also a euphemism for hormone-enhancing drugs, namely steroids and growth hormone, which have historically been linked to the sport. 
It has also been used by people in the profession to describe casual marijuana use, as wrestlers will refer to 'smoking the gimmick'.

See also
Glossary of professional wrestling terms
Kayfabe

References 

Professional wrestling slang